Karol Praženica  (born 15 November 1970) is a retired Slovak footballer and manager of Senica.

Praženica received 6 international caps for the Slovakia national football team. He was a member of the Croatian championship-winning Hajduk Split squad during the 1994-95 season.

References

External links

 Profile at Futarena 
 Profile at IDNES.cz 
 Foreign players in 1.Gambrinus liga (CZE) at RSSSF.
 Stats from Croatia at HRrepka.

1970 births
Living people
Slovak footballers
Slovakia international footballers
Slovak expatriate footballers
Association football midfielders
FK Dukla Banská Bystrica players
FC VSS Košice players
Slovak Super Liga players
SK Slavia Prague players
SK Dynamo České Budějovice players
Czech First League players
Expatriate footballers in the Czech Republic
Slovak expatriate sportspeople in the Czech Republic
HNK Hajduk Split players
Croatian Football League players
Expatriate footballers in Croatia
Slovak expatriate sportspeople in Croatia
OFI Crete F.C. players
Expatriate footballers in Greece
Slovak expatriate sportspeople in Greece
Fortuna Düsseldorf players
Expatriate footballers in Germany
Slovak expatriate sportspeople in Germany
FC Sopron players
Expatriate footballers in Hungary
Slovak expatriate sportspeople in Hungary
Slovak football managers
FK Dukla Banská Bystrica managers
FC ViOn Zlaté Moravce managers
FK Senica managers
FK Železiarne Podbrezová managers
Slovak Super Liga managers